Xiamen Post & Telecommunications Building is a 66-storey tall office skyscraper under construction at Hubin Road South and Xiahe Road in Xiamen, Fujian province, China. It will be 364 metres (1,194 ft) tall to the top of the spire and 249.7 metres (819 ft) without the spire. Construction has been suspended.

External links
 

Buildings and structures in Xiamen
Buildings and structures under construction in China